Victor Comleonoc (born 23 February 1979) is a Moldovan footballer who last played for Moldovan National Division side FC Dacia Chișinău.

Career
In February 2009, Comleonoc signed for Gabala along with Mekan Nasyrow and Pāvels Doroševs. Comleonoc scored once in his ten games for Gabala before he left for Obolon Kyiv six-months later.

International career
Comleonoc has made 19 appearances for the Moldova national football team He played four games in UEFA Euro 2008 qualifying.

Career statistics

References

External links

1979 births
Living people
Moldovan footballers
Moldova international footballers
Moldovan expatriate footballers
Expatriate footballers in Russia
Expatriate footballers in Ukraine
Moldovan expatriate sportspeople in Ukraine
Association football midfielders
FC Sheriff Tiraspol players
FC SKA Rostov-on-Don players
FC Obolon-Brovar Kyiv players
Ukrainian Premier League players
Gabala FC players
Expatriate footballers in Azerbaijan